Christopher Brendan Reginald Pelling,  (born 14 December 1947) is a British classical scholar. He was the Regius Professor of Greek, at Christ Church, Oxford, from 2003 to 2015. He was President of the Hellenic Society from 2006 to 2008.

His research interests range over Greek and Latin historiography and biography, and also over other areas of Greek literature, especially tragedy.

Biography
Educated at Cardiff High School, Pelling in the 1960s was a Senior Scholar at Balliol College, Oxford and then spent twenty-nine years as Fellow and Praelector in Classics at University College, Oxford. He broke new ground through applying literary analysis to historical texts, ranging from Tacitus to Plutarch. At the same time, he was a generous tutor, well regarded by students. He returned to Christ Church, Oxford in 2003 when he became Regius Professor of Greek. He was elected a Fellow of the British Academy (FBA) in 2009.

Radio and TV appearances
2008-01-07, BBC Radio 3, The Essay – Greek And Latin Voices
Chris Pelling (series co-anchor) explores how Thucydides's work on the Peloponnesian War furthers people's understanding of contemporary warfare, from Vietnam to Iraq.
1997-12-16, BBC 2, Timewatch - In Search of Cleopatra

Bibliography

Press articles

References

External links
Business card at Oxford University
Bryn Mawr Classical Review Book review for Characterization and Individuality in Greek Literature

 

 
 
 

Members of the Society for the Promotion of Hellenic Studies
Alumni of Christ Church, Oxford
Fellows of Christ Church, Oxford
Fellows of University College, Oxford
Fellows of the British Academy
Living people
1947 births
Regius Professors of Greek (University of Oxford)